William Wharton Cassels (11 March 1858 – 7 November 1925) was an Anglican missionary bishop.

Early life and education
Cassels was born in Oporto, Portugal, the sixth son of John Cassels, a merchant, and Ethelinda Cox, a distant relation of Warren Hastings. He was educated at Percival House School, Repton School and St John's College, Cambridge.

Work

He was ordained deacon (Rochester) on 4 June 1882 and priest on 10 June 1883. He was a curate at All Saints' South Lambeth from 1882 to 1885. A member of the famous ‘Cambridge Seven’, he joined the China Inland Mission in 1885, together with Arthur T. Polhill-Turner and Montagu Proctor-Beauchamp, the three established a proper Church of England diocese in Szechwan. In 1895, he became the Bishop of Western China (Hua Hsi Diocese). One of the foremost missionaries of his time, who possessed great gifts of organisation, he understood the Chinese and was held in great veneration by them.

Family and death
Cassels married Mary Louisa Legg, daughter of Edward Legg, at Holy Trinity Cathedral in Shanghai, on 4 October 1887. They had several children. He died on 7 November 1925 at Paoning, Szechwan, buried in the garden of St John's Cathedral of Paoning. Mrs Cassels died eight days later. He had a son Harold Cassels born in Szechwan.

Publications

See also 
 Anglicanism in Sichuan

References

Bibliography 
 

1858 births
1925 deaths
People educated at Repton School
Alumni of St John's College, Cambridge
Anglican missionaries in Sichuan
Anglican missionary bishops in China
19th-century Anglican bishops in China
20th-century Anglican bishops in China
Diocese of Szechwan
Anglican bishops of Western China